Mount Taylor is a large, flat-topped mountain,  high, having steep cliffs on the north-east side, standing  west-southwest of the head of Hope Bay at the north-east end of the Antarctic Peninsula. It was discovered by the Swedish Antarctic Expedition, 1901–04, under Otto Nordenskiöld. The mountain was charted by the Falkland Islands Dependencies Survey (FIDS) in 1946 and named in 1948 by the UK Antarctic Place-Names Committee for Captain Andrew Taylor, commander of the FIDS and leader of its base at Hope Bay in 1945.

See also
Eddy Col

References
 

Mountains of Trinity Peninsula